Eugene Daniel Stone (January 16, 1944 – March 1, 2009) was an American professional baseball player. He attended Citrus College.

Stone's pro career lasted for five seasons (1963–1964; 1967–1969), all in the Philadelphia system, and he hit 19, 21 and 20 home runs in successive minor-league campaigns. His 18-game MLB stint, in May and June 1969, included five starts at first base. Of his six career hits, one went for extra bases, a triple on June 20 against Lou Marone of the Pittsburgh Pirates.

Stone died in Colorado Springs at the age of 65.

References

External links

1944 births
2009 deaths
Bakersfield Bears players
Baseball players from California
Major League Baseball first basemen
Philadelphia Phillies players
Reading Phillies players
Spartanburg Phillies players
Sportspeople from Burbank, California
Tidewater Tides players